Cossodes is a monotypic moth genus in the family Cossidae. Its sole species, Cossodes lyonetii, is found in south-western Western Australia.

The wingspan is 55–58 mm for males and about 63 mm for females. The forewings are marked with white and black and the hindwings are bluish. Adults have been recorded on wing from December to March.

The larvae feed on Xanthorrhoea species.

References

Natural History Museum Lepidoptera generic names catalog

Cossinae
Monotypic moth genera
Moths described in 1841
Moths of Australia